"High" is a song by Australian DJ and producer Alison Wonderland featuring American rapper Trippie Redd. It was released on 20 March 2018 as the fourth single from her second studio album Awake.

Content
Alison Wonderland said at ABC's interview: "When Redd heard this song it was very organic and he jumped in the booth and we walked out feeling that we had something special. I felt like this song had a certain spirit and wanted people to feel like they were going on a journey with us... just like when watching the music video."

Music video
The music video was released on 21 March 2018, directed by Alison Wonderland herself with cinematography by Jeffrey Zoss, and animation produced by Jayme Lemperle and Evan Red Borja. The video showed the two artists sat against a backdrop of a flower bed with a glitchy trippy fold as they each smoke and roll a cigar respectively as they get "High."

Charts

Weekly charts

Year-end charts

References

2018 songs
2018 singles
Alison Wonderland songs
Trippie Redd songs
Songs written by Trippie Redd